Expletive Delighted! is a 1986 album by British folk rock band Fairport Convention, their fifteenth studio album since their debut in 1968. It is the band's only album consisting solely of instrumental tracks, despite the claim "Lyric sheet enclosed" on the album cover.

Ric Sanders, who had played on some tracks on the previous album Gladys' Leap, was invited to join Fairport full-time, as was Maartin Allcock; the result, according to Dave Pegg,  This new lineup would last for the next eleven years, the most stable of all of Fairport's configurations to that point.

Reception
Allmusic's reviewer described Expletive Delighted! as "alternately enjoyable and maddening", criticising the prominence of Dave Mattacks's drums in the mix, while praising "Portmeirion" and the title track as "delicate and beautiful as any work that this version of the band has done".

Track listing

Side one
 "The Rutland Reel/Sack the Juggler" (Ric Sanders) - 3:20
 "The Cat on the Mixer/Three Left Feet" (Maartin Allcock) - 3:37
 "Bankruptured" (Dave Pegg) - 3:04
 "Portmeirion" (Ric Sanders) - 5:21
 "Jams O'Donnell's Jigs" (Dave Pegg) - 2:48

Side two
 "Expletive Delighted" (Ric Sanders) - 1:55
 "Sigh Beg Sigh Mor" (O' Carolan) - 7:18
 "Innstuck" (Maartin Allcock) - 2:08
 "The Gas Almost Works" (John Kirkpatrick) 1:58
 "Hanks for the Memory" (various, arrangement by Jerry Donahue) - 4:38
"Shazam!" (Duane Eddy, Lee Hazlewood)
"Pipeline" (Bob Spickard, Brian Carmen)
"Apache" (Jerry Lordan)
"Peter Gunn" (Henry Mancini)

Release history
1986, August : Woodworm Records WR009, UK LP; WRC004 UK Cassette
1986 : Varrick Records VR029, US LP
1986, December : Sandstock SSM019, Australia LP
1987, August : Entente 12-3074 (833 074-928), Germany, LP (different cover, gatefold sleeve)
1990 :Varrick 	CD-VR-029, US CD
1990 : Folkprint FP002CD, UK CD, reissue with Gladys' Leap

Personnel
Fairport Convention 
 Maartin Allcock - guitars, bouzouki, mandolin
 Dave Mattacks - drums, percussion, keyboards
 Simon Nicol - guitars
 Dave Pegg - acoustic & bass guitars, mandola
 Ric Sanders - violin

Additional musicians on "Hanks for the Memory"
 Jerry Donahue - guitar
 Richard Thompson - guitar

Technical
 Tim Matyear - engineer

References

External links

1986 albums
Fairport Convention albums
Instrumental rock albums